The British Rail Class 345 is a fleet of electric multiple unit passenger trains built by Bombardier Transportation for use on London's Elizabeth line. Part of Bombardier's Aventra family of trains, the contract for their delivery was awarded as part of the Crossrail project in February 2014. A total of 70 nine-car unitseach able to carry 1,500passengerswere constructed between 2015 and 2019, at a cost of over £1billion. The first unit entered service on 22 June 2017.

History

Background and specifications

In 2008, the British government's rolling stock plan stated a requirement for around 610 carriages for Crossrail, expected to be similar in design to the Thameslink rolling stock, to meet the design improvement requirements of the 2007 "Rail Technical Strategy" (RTS), including in-cab signalling/communication with satellite and European Train Control System level 3 technologies, regenerative braking, low cost of operation and high reliability, with low weight and high acceleration.

Tests on the finished trains indicate that the energy efficiency target has been exceeded, with the Class 345 consuming only 14kWh per train-km. The trains will work with platform screen doors in the central tunnel section. The capital value of the contract, which included construction of a depot at Old Oak Common, was estimated at around £1bn. The total value may be greater due to the winning bidder being expected to undertake maintenance of the trains for three decades, the estimated lifespan of the fleet.

Bidding process and funding
In March 2011, Crossrail announced that Alstom, Bombardier, CAF, Hitachi and Siemens had been shortlisted. The initial bidding process was expected to start in late 2011, with a contract decision in 2013.

In August 2011, the invitation to tender was delayed by one year to 2012 and the contract decision to 2014, with the introduction of trains on the Great Eastern Main Line expected from May 2017 (previously December 2016), with a correspondingly shortened production schedule. The delay was a cost-saving measure to avoid new vehicles being unused whilst Crossrail tunnelling was completed; it also postponed bidding until after a review of governmental procurement processes. Alstom withdrew from the bidding process in August 2011, stating it lacked a suitable developed product. Concerns about taxpayer value for money on PFI funded projects led to Transport for London (TfL) seeking to purchase the trains outright. In December 2011 the request to raise the debt ceiling at TfL to allow the acquisition with public funds was refused by the Department for Transport.

In February 2012, an invitation to negotiate was issued, which included clauses on 'responsible procurement' relating to UK supply chain sourcing and training opportunities; the procurement became politicised after Bombardier failed to win the Thameslink rolling stock contract, and said it might have to close its UK assembly plant (Derby Litchurch Lane, at the time the only operational rolling stock manufacturer in the UK) if it did not win the Crossrail contract.

Formal bids were expected in mid-2012, with a decision in early 2014, based on the proposed product meeting the design requirements, and on value for money. Procurement was expected to be partly public and partly privately financed. In September 2012, the government announced that it would underwrite a further £240million of the project cost under its 'UK Guarantees' infrastructure credit funding scheme, in addition to the 30 per cent of the project being government funded. Siemens withdrew from the tendering process in July 2013, citing a likelihood of insufficient production capacity in the production timeframe.

Contract award and construction 
In December 2013, the European Investment Bank (EIB) agreed to provide loans to Transport for London for the rolling stock of up to £500million. On 6 February 2014, it was announced that Bombardier Transportation had been awarded a £1bn contract to supply 65 trains, with an option for 18 more. The trains were constructed at Bombardier's Derby Litchurch Lane Works, with testing scheduled to begin in May 2016. On 29 July 2016, the first completed train was unveiled by Bombardier and Transport for London at Derby Litchurch Lane.

In March 2018, an option for five more units was exercised taking the order to 70 units.

Sale and leaseback 
In January 2018, it was proposed that the fleet would be sold by TfL and leased back in order to provide funding for the New Tube for London. This £1bn, twenty-year, sale-and-leaseback deal was agreed in March 2019.

Operations

The first train entered service on 22 June 2017 on the eastern TfL Rail route between London Liverpool Street and Shenfield as a seven-car unit. The complete nine-car sets could not be accommodated at the Liverpool Street termini until platforms were lengthened in 2021.

The trains entered service on the western TfL Rail route between London Paddington and Hayes & Harlington in May 2018, before running to Reading by December 2019. Trains on the western route were initially delivered in seven-car formation, however these are being progressively converted into full nine-car units.

The new trains have wholly replaced the Class 315 units previously used on TfL Rail services to Shenfield, and have predominantly replaced the Class 387s of Great Western Railway on services to Reading, as well as wholly replacing the Class 360s of the former Heathrow Connect on services to Heathrow. The trains have free Wi-Fi and 4G available, as well as being fully accessible for wheelchair users.

In May 2020, the Office of Rail and Road (ORR) authorised the Class 345s to operate into Heathrow Terminals 2 & 3, Heathrow Terminal 4 and Heathrow Terminal 5, with service to start later on in the year. On 30 July 2020, the Class 345 began operation to and from Heathrow. On 24 May 2022, the trains began service in the central core section as the Elizabeth line. Trains were rebranded from TfL Rail to Elizabeth line for the start of service.

Fleet details
The 70 units are formed from a total of 630 carriages. Like many other contemporary designs for commuter rolling stock, the trains feature open gangways between carriages. There are no toilets on board. Trains have a mix of longitudinal and transverse seating, all of which is standard class.

Named units
The following units have received names.
345024: Heidi Alexander

See also
 Class 700, a fleet of units procured from Siemens Mobility for the Thameslink Programme, to a broadly similar specification.
 Class 710, a similar fleet of Aventra units used by London Overground.

References

External links 

 
 

345
Crossrail
25 kV AC multiple units
Train-related introductions in 2017
Bombardier Transportation multiple units